The 2008–09 TVL Premier League or 2008–09 Port Vila Premier League is the 15th season of the Port Vila Premier League top division.

The top five of the league qualify for the 2009 VFF Bred Cup, the national league of Vanuatu.

Tafea FC were champions and Erakor Golden Star and Ifira Black Bird relegated to the 2009–10 TVL First Division.

Teams 
 Amicale FC
 Erakor Golden Star
 Ifira Black Bird
 Seveners United
 Tafea FC
 Tupuji Imere
 Westtan Broncos
 Yatel FC

Standings

References

External links
 

Port Vila Football League seasons
2008–09 in Vanuatuan football
Port
Port